Khalifeh Gavabar (also Romanized as Khalīfeh Gavābar, Khalīfeh Gavāber,  and Khalīfehgovāber) is a village in Otaqvar Rural District, Otaqvar District, Langarud County, Gilan Province, Iran. At the 2006 census, its population was 23, in 7 families.

References 

Populated places in Langarud County